Thomas J. Kearns (November 9, 1859 – December 7, 1938), was a Major League Baseball player who played catcher in two games for the 1880 Buffalo Bisons and second base in 25 games for the 1882 and 1884 Detroit Wolverines.

External links

1859 births
1938 deaths
Major League Baseball second basemen
Buffalo Bisons (NL) players
Detroit Wolverines players
19th-century baseball players
Rochester (minor league baseball) players
Grand Rapids (minor league baseball) players
Toledo Avengers players
Syracuse Stars (minor league baseball) players
Portland (minor league baseball) players
Toronto Canucks players
London Tecumsehs (baseball) players
Hamilton Hams players
Omaha Omahogs players
Omaha Lambs players
Providence Clamdiggers (baseball) players
Memphis Giants players
Troy Trojans (minor league) players
Baseball players from New York (state)
Sportspeople from Rochester, New York
Rochester Yellowjackets baseball players